The Silver Condor Award for Best Director, given by the Argentine Film Critics Association, awards the best director in Argentina each year:

 
Argentine Film Critics Association